The Adventure of the Yellow Curl Papers (also known as The Mystery of the Yellow Curl Papers) is a 1915 American silent short comedy-drama film directed by Clem Easton and starring William Garwood in the lead role with Violet Mersereau.

Cast
 William Garwood as Ted
 Violet Merereau as Flo

External links

1915 films
American silent short films
American black-and-white films
1915 comedy-drama films
1910s American films
Silent American comedy-drama films
1910s English-language films
Comedy-drama short films